The Direction Nationale des Archives du Mali is a governmental entity responsible for safeguarding archival heritage of Mali, including the collection and preservation of its national archives. The National Assembly approved its creation in 2002 (decree n°02-262/P-RM du 24 mai 2002). Previously the Minister of Culture directed archives-related efforts.

Archives Nationales du Mali
The Malian national archives is headquartered in Bamako on the Avenue de l’Union Africaine. Prior to 2006 it was in the Kuluba area of the city. As of 1979 the governmental Institut des Sciences Humaines  oversaw the archives.

The materials kept in the archives are grouped as "old" (pre-1915), "recent" (1915-1958), and "new" (since 1958) (fonds anciens, recents, nouveaux) and organized by topic, as follows:
 A. Official Acts 
 B. General Correspondence 
 D. Ethnological, Geographical and Historical Studies; Administrative Organization; Deliberations of the Administrative Council; États Civils; Census; Taxes; Conseil Supérieur; Cartography and Topography 
 E. Politics; Religions; Islamic Affairs; Exterior Relations 
 F. Police; Prisons
 G. Education
 H. Health; Public Assistance 
 J: Postal Service
 K: Railroads
 L: Navigation; Meteorology; Aviation
 M: Justice
 N. Military
 O: Property and Land Grants
 P. Customs 
 Q: Economic Affairs; Industry; Mines
 R: Agriculture; Zoological; Forests; Fish
 S: Labor
 T: Budget; Treasury; Special Agencies 
 U: Archives

Staff
Directors have included:
 Moussa Niakaté, 1964-circa 1974?
 Aliou Ongoïba, circa 1992-2013
 Seydou Diabaté, circa 2017

See also
 National Library of Mali

References

Bibliography
in English
 
 
 

in French

External links
  (Notes taken by Jones during research in the archives; includes description of fonds and series)

mali
Archives in Mali
Government of Mali
History of Mali
Bamako